Jay W. Mathis (born April 24, 1970) is an American politician. He was a member of the Mississippi House of Representatives from the 45th district. A Republican, he ran unopposed in a special election in May 2015 to replace Bennett Malone. Mathis unsuccessfully challenged Malone in 2007 and 2011 and chose not to run for reelection in the November 2015 elections due to redistricting.

References

1970 births
Living people
Republican Party members of the Mississippi House of Representatives
21st-century American politicians
People from Carthage, Mississippi